Godfreyhole is a hamlet in Derbyshire, England.

References

Hamlets in Derbyshire
Derbyshire Dales